Route 261 is a north/south highway on the south shore of the Saint Lawrence River in Quebec, Canada. Its northern terminus is in Bécancour (south of Trois-Rivières) at the junction of Route 132 and its southern terminus is in Saint-Valère at the junction of Route 161.

Towns along Route 261
 Becancour
 Saint-Sylvere
 Maddington Falls
 Daveluyville
 Saint-Valere

See also
 List of Quebec provincial highways

References

External links 
 Route 261 on Google Maps
 Provincial Route Map (Courtesy of the Quebec Ministry of Transportation) 

261